Ramon Berenguer or Raymond Berengar may refer to:

 Ramon Berenguer I, Count of Barcelona (1023–1076), called "the Old"
 Ramon Berenguer II, Count of Barcelona (1053/54–1082), called "the Towhead"
 Ramon Berenguer III, Count of Barcelona (1082–1131), called "the Great"; also Ramon Berenguer I, Count of Provence
 Ramon Berenguer IV, Count of Barcelona (c. 1114–1162), called "the Holy"
 Ramon Berenguer II, Count of Provence (c. 1135–1166)
 Ramon Berenguer III, Count of Provence (c. 1158–1181)
 Ramon Berenguer IV, Count of Provence (1198–1245)
 Raymond Berengar of Andria (between 1279 and 1282–1307)
 Raymond Berengar (Grand Master of the Knights Hospitaller) (died 1374)

See also
 Berenguer Ramon (disambiguation)